Machilipatnam Port is a proposed deep sea port on the coast of Bay of Bengal. It is located at Machilipatnam, the District Headquarters of Krishna district in the Indian state of Andhra Pradesh. Although Dr. YS Rajasekhara Reddy laid the foundation for the port in 2008, no significant efforts have been made after his demise in 2009.

Andhra Pradesh former Chief Minister Nara Chandrababu Naidu started the construction of the port, and the pylon was inaugurated.

The port was originally expected to begin its operations by 2021. Navayuga Engineering Company Limited bagged the project to develop the port on a build-own-operate-transfer basis.

After the YSR Congress party came into power in Andhra Pradesh state in 2019, the project was handed to RITES and was asked to submit a DPR for the same by December 2019. The works were expected to begin by 2020.

There is a proposal to develop a mega thermal power plant near Machilipatnam during 11th Five Year Plan. It is proposed to construct of 2 Nos. General cargo berth and 1 OSV berth in Phase 1 Depth of the Channel: 12.80 Mt with ship handled capacity is 65000 DWT and port anticipated handling capacity.

History
During the 18th century, the port was a trading base for the European traders.

References

buildings and structures in Krishna district
ports and harbours of Andhra Pradesh
Proposed infrastructure in Andhra Pradesh
transport in Machilipatnam